Gorham House, also known as Elliot House, is a historic home located at Loudonville in Albany County, New York.  It was built in 1926 and is a 2-story, five-bay Colonial Revival–style brick dwelling with flanking -story wings.  It was built partially of recycled materials from the 1806 Hegeman house in Vischer Ferry, New York.

It was listed on the National Register of Historic Places in 1979.

References

Houses on the National Register of Historic Places in New York (state)
Colonial Revival architecture in New York (state)
Houses completed in 1926
Houses in Albany County, New York
Landmarks in San Diego
National Register of Historic Places in Albany County, New York